The Punjab women's cricket team is the women's representative cricket team for the Pakistani province of Punjab. They competed in the Women's Cricket Challenge Trophy in 2011–12 and 2012–13.

History
Punjab competed in the Twenty20 Women's Cricket Challenge Trophy in its first two seasons, in 2011–12 and 2012–13. They finished top of their group in both seasons, qualifying for the final. However, they lost the final both times, by 93 runs and 60 runs, both to Zarai Taraqiati Bank Limited.

Players

Notable players
Players who played for Punjab and played internationally are listed below, in order of first international appearance (given in brackets):

 Marina Iqbal (2009)
 Sidra Ameen (2011)
 Elizebath Khan (2012)
 Iram Javed (2013)
 Anam Amin (2014)
 Sidra Nawaz (2014)

Seasons

Women's Cricket Challenge Trophy

Honours
 Women's Cricket Challenge Trophy:
 Winners (0):
 Best finish: Runners-up (2011–12 & 2012–13)

See also
 Punjab cricket team (Pakistan)

References

Women's cricket teams in Pakistan